Régis Edouard Klebert Charlet (4 May 1920 – 31 October 1998) was a French ski jumper. He competed in the individual event at the 1948 Winter Olympics.

References

External links
 

1920 births
1998 deaths
French male ski jumpers
Olympic ski jumpers of France
Ski jumpers at the 1948 Winter Olympics
People from Chamonix
Sportspeople from Haute-Savoie